Young Round Barn is a historic round barn at Greene in Chenango County, New York built in 1914. It is located on ‘’’Round Barn Farm’’’.

Design 
The barn was built by DeVern Bates for James Clifford Young after his previous barn burned down in 1914. Bates was familiar with circular barn design having designed one for the University of Illinois in 1910. It is covered by a conical, two slope gambrel roof topped with a circular cupola venting the loft and central silo. DeVern Bates also built the nearby Bates Round Barn.

It was added to the National Register of Historic Places in 1984.

References

Round barns in New York (state)
Barns on the National Register of Historic Places in New York (state)
Infrastructure completed in 1914
Buildings and structures in Chenango County, New York
National Register of Historic Places in Chenango County, New York